Mina Aganagić is a mathematical physicist who works as a professor in the Center for Theoretical Physics, the Department of Mathematics, the Department of Physics at the University of California, Berkeley.

Career
Aganagić was raised in Sarajevo, Bosnia and Herzegovina, Yugoslavia.
She has a bachelor's degree and a doctorate from the California Institute of Technology, in 1995 and 1999 respectively; her PhD advisor was John Henry Schwarz.  She was a postdoctoral fellow at the Harvard University physics department
from 1999 to 2003. She then joined the physics faculty at the University of Washington, where she became a Sloan Research Fellow and a DOE Outstanding Junior Investigator. She moved to UC Berkeley in 2004. In 2016 the Simons Foundation gave her a Simons Investigator Award and the same year American Physical Society had awarded her with its fellowship.

Research
She is known for applying string theory to various problems in mathematics, including knot theory (refined Chern–Simons theory), enumerative geometry, mirror symmetry, and the geometric Langlands correspondence.

Selected publications

References

External links
Physics Department home page
Math Department home page

Year of birth missing (living people)
Living people
Yugoslav emigrants to the United States
California Institute of Technology alumni
University of Washington faculty
University of California, Berkeley College of Letters and Science faculty
Bosnia and Herzegovina mathematicians
21st-century American mathematicians
American women mathematicians
Mathematical physicists
Simons Investigator
21st-century women mathematicians
American string theorists
Fellows of the American Physical Society
American women physicists
 21st-century American women scientists
 Quantum physicists